Gabriel's Rebellion was a planned slave rebellion in the Richmond, Virginia, area in the summer of 1800. Information regarding the revolt, which came to be known as "Gabriel's Rebellion", was leaked prior to its execution, and Gabriel, a blacksmith who planned the event, and twenty-five followers were hanged. The site of Gabriel's execution was for several years believed to have been at the Shockoe Bottom African Burial Ground, historically known as the Burial Ground for Negroes. His execution was advertised as occurring at the usual place, however in 1800 that may have been a location other than the Burial Ground for Negroes. The location of Gabriel's burial is also unknown.

Gabriel's planned uprising was notable not because of its results—the rebellion was quelled before it could begin—but because of its potential for mass chaos and widespread violence. There were other slave rebellions, but this one "most directly confronted" the Founding Fathers "with the chasm between the ideal of liberty and their messy accommodations to slavery."

Virginia and other state legislatures passed restrictions on free blacks, as well as prohibiting the education, assembly, and hiring out of slaves, to restrict their ability and chances to plan similar rebellions.

In 2002, the City of Richmond passed a resolution in honor of Gabriel on the 202nd anniversary of the planned rebellion. In 2007, Governor Tim Kaine gave Gabriel and his followers an informal pardon, in recognition that his cause, "the end of slavery and the furtherance of equality for all people—has prevailed in the light of history".

Gabriel Prosser

Gabriel ( – October 10, 1800), referred to by some as Gabriel Prosser, the surname of his slaveholder, was a man of African descent born into slavery in 1776 at Brookfield, a large tobacco plantation in Henrico County, Virginia. He and two brothers, Solomon and Martin, were held in bondage by slaveholder Thomas Prosser, the owner of Brookfield. Gabriel was literate. He was one of the rare 5% of enslaved people of the colonial era who were able to learn to read and write.

Gabriel trained as a blacksmith and a carpenter. His brother Solomon, and perhaps his father, was a blacksmith. Gabriel, "hired out" by his enslaver to work in Richmond foundries, was able to keep a portion of the wages that he earned. The bulk of it went to Thomas Prosser. Gabriel traveled freely throughout Richmond and Henrico County to work for plantation and business owners.

Gabriel was married to Nanny, an enslaved woman. They were not known to most historians as having had any children. He was described in newspaper articles as having stood "six feet two or three inches high". His long and "bony face, well made", was marred by the loss of his two front teeth and "two or three scars on his head". White people as well as black people regarded the literate young man as "a fellow of great courage and intellect above his rank in life".

In 1799, Gabriel, his brother Soloman, and a man named Jupiter, tried to steal a pig from Absalom Johnson. Gabriel got into a scuffle with Johnson and he bit off part of Johnson's ear. Jupiter was charged with stealing a hog, which was a misdemeanor and Soloman was not charged. It was a capital offense for an enslaved person to assault a white person. He could have been hanged for the assault. Because he was a valuable bondsman for Prosser, the judge sentenced him to jail for one month and had his thumb branded. Gabriel was released from jail when slaveholder Prosser paid a bond for his release and he promised a year of good behavior. Richmond history professor and slave law expert Philip J. Schwarz states that it showed Gabriel's intention "to consciously challenge the system of slave control." See also History of slavery in Virginia § Food.

Historian Douglas R. Egerton and author of Gabriel's Rebellion, states: "He was physically big, he was literate, he's a fighter, he's a skilled artisan. For all these reasons, he was a natural leader."

Background to the revolt
In Richmond, there were slightly more blacks than whites, with a total population of 5,700 in 1800. Richmond was a slave town, with a community whipping post where slaveholders had punishment meted out in a public square. Enslaved men loaded and moved flatboats of tobacco and other cargo.  Throughout the state in 1800, 39.2% of the total population were slaves; they were concentrated on plantations in the Tidewater region and west of Richmond.

Gabriel, living in Virginia in the late eighteenth century, was influenced by the prevailing themes of liberty expounded by the supporters of the American. During his lifetime, the number of free people of color had grown markedly in the Upper South. Many slaves were manumitted thanks in part to the efforts of Methodist and Quaker abolitionists. Their number was augmented by free black refugees from the Haitian Revolution, many of whom had been slaveowners themselves. Some Virginia slaveholders were nervous about the sharp increase in the number of free blacks in the slave state.

The revolt and outcome

Some historians assert that Gabriel became the leader of the planned rebellion because he was highly intelligent, literate, and a blacksmith. Enslaved and free Black-American men in Virginia taught their metalwork skills to their sons.

During the spring and summer of 1800, Gabriel began to plan a revolt that intended to end slavery in Virginia. Plans were made with enslaved people over 10 counties and the cities of Richmond, Norfolk, and Petersburg, Virginia. 

He and his brothers, as well as other blacksmiths, turned scythe blades into as many as twelve dozen swords. Musket balls and 50 spears were created. They intended to steal muskets from a tavern. Hundreds of slaves from central Virginia expected to march into Richmond and take control of the Virginia State Armory and the Virginia State Capitol. The plan was to hold Virginia's Governor James Monroe hostage so that they could negotiate for their freedom. 

But on  August 30, 1800, the planned day of attack, heavy rain flooded the streets of Richmond and the creeks in central Virginia. In addition, two slaves told their owner, Mosby Sheppard, about the plans. Sheppard warned  Governor Monroe, who called out the state militia. They patrolled the area and began picking up conspirators. Gabriel escaped downriver to Norfolk, but he was spotted and betrayed there by another slave named Will "Billy" King. More than 70 enslaved men were arrested by law enforcement for conspiracy and insurrection.

Gabriel was returned to Richmond for questioning, but he did not submit. The trial was heard by five justices in courts of oyer and terminer, rather than a jury. A recruit, Ben Woolfolk, testified that Gabriel intended on writing the words 'death or liberty' on a silk flag, referring to Patrick Henry's Give me liberty, or give me death! speech of 1775. One of the enslaved men reportedly said "I have nothing more to offer than what General Washington would have had to offer, had he been taken by the British and put to trial."

Gabriel, his two brothers, and 23 other slaves were hanged. One individual committed suicide before his arraignment. Eight enslaved men were moved or sold outside of Virginia. Thirteen were found guilty, but were pardoned by the governor. Twenty five were acquitted. Two men received their freedom for informing their slaveholder of the plot.

Influence
The rebellion was reported in newspapers across the country. James Monroe and Thomas Jefferson were concerned about the optics of having so many people executed. Jefferson said, "the other states & the world at large will forever condemn us if we indulge in a principle of revenge." The Federalists argued that the rebellion occurred as a result of the Democratic-Republican Party's support of the French Revolution. 

Fears of a slave revolt regularly swept major slaveholding communities. After the rebellion, many slaveholders greatly restricted the slaves' ability to travel after a second conspiracy was discovered in 1802 among enslaved boatmen along the Appomattox and Roanoke Rivers. New laws were enacted to restrict free blacks and slaves. The Virginia Assembly in 1802 made it illegal for blacks, whether free or enslaved, to obtain and pilot or navigate a boat. Two years later, they were unable to meet in groups after their work was done or on Sundays. In 1808, state legislators banned hiring out of slaves and required freed blacks to leave the state within 12 months or face re-enslavement. The growing population of free blacks had to petition the legislature to stay in the state.

Historiography
The historian Douglas Egerton offered a new perspective on Gabriel in his book Gabriel's Rebellion: The Virginia Slave Conspiracies of 1800 & 1802 (1993). He based this on extensive primary research from surviving contemporary documents. Egerton concluded that Gabriel would have been stimulated and challenged at the foundries by interacting with co-workers of European, African and mixed descent. They hoped Thomas Jefferson's Republicans would liberate them from domination by the wealthy Federalist merchants of the city. 

The internal dynamics of Jefferson's and Monroe's party in the 1800 elections were complex.  A significant part of the Republican base were major planters and colleagues of Thomas Jefferson and James Madison. Egerton believes that any sign that white radicals, and particularly Frenchmen, had supported Gabriel's plan could have cost Jefferson the presidential election of 1800. Slaveholders feared such violent excesses as those related to the French Revolution after 1789 and the rebellion of slaves in Saint-Domingue. Egerton believed that Gabriel planned to take Governor Monroe hostage to negotiate an end to slavery.  Then he planned to "drink and dine with the merchants of the city".

Egerton noted that Gabriel instructed his followers not to kill white Methodists, Quakers and Frenchmen. During this period, Methodists and Quakers were active missionaries for manumission.

Legacy and honors
Gabriel's rebellion served as an important example of slaves' taking action to gain freedom.

 In 2002, the City of Richmond adopted a resolution to commemorate the 202nd anniversary "of the execution of the patriot and freedom fighter, Gabriel, whose death stands as a symbol for the determination and struggle of slaves to obtain freedom, justice and equality as promised by the fundamental principles of democratic governments of the Commonwealth of Virginia and the United States of America".
 The Spring Park Historic Site in Henrico County commemorates Gabriel.
 In 2004, the Virginia Board of Historic Resources approved a marker at the spot where Gabriel was hanged on October 10, 1800. It is between 15th and 16th streets, on the north side of East Broad Street. The state worked with individuals from a group called the Defenders for Freedom, Justice & Equality.
 In the fall of 2006, the Virginia State Conference of the NAACP requested Gov. Tim Kaine pardon Gabriel in recognition of his contributions to the civil rights struggle of African Americans and all peoples.
 On August 30, 2007, Governor  Kaine informally pardoned Gabriel and his co-conspirators.  Kaine said that Gabriel's motivation had been "his devotion to the ideals of the American revolution—it was worth risking death to secure liberty". Kaine noted that "Gabriel's cause—the end of slavery and the furtherance of equality of all people—has prevailed in the light of history", and added that "it is important to acknowledge that history favorably regards Gabriel's cause while consigning legions who sought to keep him and others in chains to be forgotten".

Popular culture
Arna Bontemps wrote Black Thunder (1936), a historical novel based on Gabriel's Rebellion.
Gigi Amateau wrote Come August, Come Freedom: The Bellows, The Gallows, and The Black General Gabriel (2012), an historical fiction novel based on Gabriel's Rebellion.
In Roots, Alex Haley's historical fiction, the rebellion is heard of by the book's characters.
In Sally Hemings, Barbara Chase-Riboud's 1979 novel about Hemings's relationship with Thomas Jefferson, Monroe writes Jefferson asking his advice on what to do about the insurrectionists still in jail after "(m)ore than thirty-five" had been executed. Hemings intercedes on their behalf, telling Jefferson, "I think there has been enough hanging", and suggests they be exiled instead. Although it is not made explicit in the novel, it is implied that Jefferson followed her suggestion and advised Monroe accordingly. At the end of the chapter, Hemings says, "I heard that the last of Gabriel's rebels had been reprieved and banished from Virginia by James Monroe. I had not pleaded in vain."
"Gabriel, the Musical" was produced at Firehouse Theatre in Richmond Virginia September 8, 2022 through October 2, 2022. With libretto by Jerold Solomon, Foster Solomon and Ron Klipp and Music & Lyrics by Ron Klipp, the musical tells a semi-fictionalized account of thee development of Gabriel's conspiracy and its aftermath on the conspirators, the local government, and the nation. The production was funded in part by a 2020 grant from the National Endowment for the Arts (grant 1861109-28-20).

Songs 
 Tim Barry, a singer/songwriter from Richmond, wrote and performed "Prosser's Gabriel" for the album 28th & Stonewall. It chronicles the events of Gabriel's life, focusing on the attempted revolution.
 Gabriel is mentioned in Public Enemy's song "Prophets of Rage".
 Gabriel is the hero of a cleverly subversive sea shanty recorded some forty years after events in Frederick Marryat's book, Poor Jack (1840).

See also
 Denmark Vesey
 History of slavery in Virginia
 List of enslaved people
 Nat Turner
 Slavery in the United States

Notes

References

Further reading 

 Aptheker, Herbert. American Negro Slave Revolts. New York: International Publishers, 1943.
 Nicholls, Michael L. Whispers of Rebellion: Narrating Gabriel's Conspiracy. Charlottesville, VA: University of Virginia Press, 2012.
 Schwarz, Philip J. "Gabriel's Challenge: Slaves and Crime in Late Eighteenth-Century Virginia", Virginia Magazine of History and Biography Volume 90, Issue 3, pp. 283–309, 1982.
 Schwarz, Philip J. Gabriel's Conspiracy: A Documentary History. Charlottesville: University of Virginia Press, 2012.
 Rodriguez, Junius P., ed. Encyclopedia of Slave Resistance and Rebellion. Westport, CT: Greenwood, 2006.

External links
 The Library of Virginia holds documentation related to Gabriel's life and the events surrounding the attempted rebellion

 The Collegian, Community gathers for 20th Annual Gabriel Gathering at Shockoe Bottom African Burial Ground

 Richmond Magazine, Nice Shot: Illumination and ReclamationThe 20th annual Gabriel Gathering at the African Burial Ground in Shockoe Bottom, Nov 8, 2022

 Black Agenda Report, Commemorating Gabriel's Rebellion at the African Burial Ground in Richmond, Virginia, Sept 30, 2022

 Sacred Ground Historical Reclamation Project, Gabriel's Rebellion

1776 births
1800 deaths
18th-century executions of American people
American rebel slaves
18th-century American slaves
Conflicts in 1800
Executed African-American people
Executed revolutionaries
History of Richmond, Virginia
History of slavery in Virginia
People executed by Virginia by hanging
People from Henrico County, Virginia
Executed people from Virginia
Recipients of American gubernatorial pardons
Slave rebellions in the United States